And (stylized in all caps) is an upcoming anthology film directed by Yorgos Lanthimos from a script he co-wrote with Efthymis Filippou.  The film stars Emma Stone, Jesse Plemons, Willem Dafoe, Hong Chau, and Margaret Qualley.  Searchlight Pictures is distributing the film.

Cast 
 Emma Stone 
 Jesse Plemons 
 Willem Dafoe 
 Margaret Qualley 
 Hong Chau 
 Joe Alwyn 
 Mamoudou Athie
 Hunter Schafer

Production 
Yorgos Lanthimos and Efthymis Filippou wrote the script for AND under development with Element Pictures and Film4, and Searchlight Pictures agreed to distribute the film, which Lanthimos would direct as well. Emma Stone, Jesse Plemons, Willem Dafoe, and Margaret Qualley were set to star in the film with plans to begin shooting in New Orleans in October. In October 2022, Hong Chau, Joe Alwyn, and Mamoudou Athie joined the cast. In a February 2023 interview, Hunter Schafer revealed she had "a little cameo" in the film.

Filming began in October 2022 and went through December 2022 in New Orleans.

References

External links 
 

American anthology films
British anthology films
Film4 Productions films
Films directed by Yorgos Lanthimos
Films shot in New Orleans
Searchlight Pictures films
Upcoming films
Upcoming English-language films